François Bordes tram stop is located on line  of the tramway de Bordeaux.

Location 
The station is located on the avenue des Facultés in Talence in the university area.

Junctions 
There are no junctions with other tram lines or buses at this station.

Close by
 Université Bordeaux 1

See also 
 TBC
 Tramway de Bordeaux

External links 
 

Bordeaux tramway stops
Tram stops in Talence
Railway stations in France opened in 2004